Constellation is a drama film that was released by Codeblack Entertainment and 20th Century Fox in 2007. It had its French premiere in Cannes, and in Britain premiered as a special screening at the American embassy in London.

Plot
Returning to Huntsville, Alabama—a town that once held back their opportunities but now glistens as a modern, technology-based city—the Boxer family and its extended members discover in the memory of a loved one what binds them together.

When the beloved Carmel Boxer passes away, her entire family returns to the Deep South to celebrate her life and legacy. As the Boxer family comes together for the first time in many years, revelations of Carmel's painful past begin to force each person to address their pent-up emotions and true feelings for one another. The story chronicles the lives and loves of this African-American family as its members are forced to come to terms with a tumultuous past marked by an unrequited interracial affair. The film explores the way in which the family patriarch, Helms Boxer, must confront his demons amid the changing racial fabric of society and his own family.

Cast

Production
Constellation was filmed entirely on location in Huntsville, Alabama.

Reception
, the film holds a 0% approval rating on Rotten Tomatoes, based on 20 reviews with an average rating of 3.27/10. The site's critics consensus states "Though earnestly directed, Constellation lacks dramatic fireworks and eventually falls into TV-movie sentimentality."

However, the Los Angeles Times said in its review that the film was "highly entertaining and emotional," and that "Walker-Pearlman is adept at revealing the effect these people and others have on each other, especially on Helms, played with depth and restraint by Williams." The film won Best Independent Film of the Year at the Black Reel Awards from the Foundation for the Advancement of African-Americans in Film, made up largely of African-American film critics.

References

External links 
 
 

2005 films
2005 romantic drama films
African-American films
American romantic drama films
Culture of Huntsville, Alabama
Films set in Alabama
Films shot in Alabama
Films about interracial romance
2000s English-language films
2000s American films